Phi Delta Epsilon (commonly known as PhiDE) is a co-ed international medical fraternity and a member of the Professional Fraternity Association.

History
Phi Delta Epsilon was founded on October 13, 1904, at Cornell University Medical College.  Founders were:
 Aaron Brown
 Henry Aaronson
 Michael Halpern Barsky
 Bernard Hyle Eliasberg
 Irving Harold Engel
 Philip Frank
 Abraham Leon Garbat
 William Isidore Wallach

During the first decade of this century there were many doors closed to Jewish medical students and physicians, doors which would not fully open until after World War II. In 1904, it was not uncommon for American medical schools and medical fraternities to have quotas limiting admission of Jewish students. Thus, Brown and his friends decided to start their own fraternal organization, guided by the precepts of philanthropy, deity, and equity.

Soon after, more chapters were organized in the East and Midwest. In 1918, Phi Delta Epsilon amalgamated with Alpha Phi Sigma, a medical fraternity organized in 1908, whose ideals and principles were similar to those of PhiDE. Its seven existing chapters were in the Midwest and West, which geographically complemented the existing PhiDE chapters.

Following the merge, the chapters were divided into districts, and by 1930, enough members had graduated from medical schools to form graduate clubs. In 1926, an Endowment Fund was started. In the 1940s, the Aaron Brown Lectureship Program was begun and has remained an important chapter event through the years.

In the late 1960s, the fraternity opened its membership to women and encouraged recruitment of medical students of all races, nationalities and religious beliefs. The fraternity's membership diversified throughout the following decades. The addition of the premedical affiliation in 1994 at Binghamton University rounded out the fraternity's membership, which now spans an entire lifetime of medical education and practice.

The Fraternity has over 35,000 practicing professionals in its active network.

Symbols
Over the course of its history, the fraternity has recognized three badges. The first and oldest badge includes the Greek letter Phi on its left side, Delta at its top, and Epsilon on its right. The Delta is set with pearls on its sides and amethysts at its angles. Below the Delta is a torch, and in front of the torch is a bow with a ruby at its center. All badges are identical, but as occasion demands various stones are placed therein to designate successful completion of a term in a specific International Board office.

The fraternity's premedical badge is made of 14 carat gold and is triangular in shape. The left side of its face is purple, while the right side is ivory. The medical badge, also made of 14 carat gold, consists of a torch centered in front of the outline of a triangle.

The seal of the fraternity consists of the scales of justice with the letters Phi, Delta, and Epsilon on the sides and at the bottom. The scale is balanced upon a caduceus with a Delta as its base. The letter Alpha appears beside the left wing and the letter Sigma beside the right. Above the center of the wings is a star containing the letter Phi.

Both badge and seal may only be used or worn by initiated members.

The Fraternity's colors are Royal purple and ivory.

Other symbols of PhiDE include amethyst, pearl, and the scarlet red carnation.

Chapters
The chapter list of Phi Delta Epsilon includes the following groups. Those founded prior to 1962 are noted in Baird's Manual (20th ed), while newer chapters are from the Fraternity's website:

Other professional medical fraternities
In addition to the medical fraternities listed here, there are numerous chiropractic, pre-health, pharmacy and nursing fraternities.
 Alpha Delta Theta, medical technology
 Alpha Gamma Kappa
 Alpha Kappa Kappa
 Alpha Phi Sigma, see Phi Delta Epsilon 
 Alpha Tau Sigma, Osteopathic, dormant
 Mu Sigma Phi, Philippines
 Nu Sigma Nu
 Omega Tau Sigma, veterinary medicine
 Omega Upsilon Phi, see Phi Beta Pi
 Phi Alpha Gamma, formerly Homeopathic, see Phi Chi
 Phi Beta Pi
 Phi Chi
 Phi Kappa Mu, Philippines
 Phi Lambda Kappa
 Phi Rho Sigma
 Sigma Mu Delta, pre-medical
 Theta Kappa Psi

See also 
List of Jewish fraternities and sororities

References

External links
 Phi Delta Epsilon homepage

Student organizations established in 1904
Professional medical fraternities and sororities in the United States
Historically Jewish fraternities in the United States
Professional Fraternity Association
1904 establishments in New York (state)
Jewish organizations established in 1904